Urna Chahar Tugchi, known as Urna, (born 1969) is an Inner Mongolian singer and player of the yangqin.

Biography
Urna was born into a family of herders in the grasslands of the Ordos Plateau in Inner Mongolia, a society where song was a ubiquitous part of everyday life. Her first musical training was learning to play the yangqin—Chinese dulcimer—from a Shanghai Conservatory of Music professor who was visiting Hohhot, the capital of Inner Mongolia. Then, at the age of 18, she moved to study at the Shanghai Conservatory, a challenging step since she had no knowledge of the Chinese language.

She now performs around the world, and is based in Bavaria, Germany and in Cairo, Egypt. In 2003, she was awarded the RUTH prize in Germany for Best International Artist.

Discography and filmography
Urna has produced seven albums of music on CD:
1995 – Tal Nutag (13 tracks) – with Robert Zollitsch (zither) and Oliver Kälberer (guitar, mandolin) – recorded in a Bavarian church, Mongolian songs and improvisations
1997 – Crossing
1999 – Hödööd (11 tracks) – with Robert Zollitsch (zither, vocal, percussion), Wu Wei playing the Sheng and Sebastian Hilken playing the cello and the frame drum – Mongolian songs and original compositions
2001 – Jamar (10 tracks) – with Robert Zollitsch playing the zither and throat-singing, Morin khuur-virtuoso Burintegus and Ramesh Shotham (Indian percussion) – lyrics in Chinese and Mongolian
2002 – Hodood
2004 – Amilal (13 tracks) – with Djamchid and Keyvan Chemirani, Zarb percussionists from Iran and Zoltan Lantos (Violin) – a personal record of her travels and her world view
2012 – Portrait d'URNA: Tenggeriin Shivuu
2018 – Ser (12 tracks) – with  Kroke

She is also featured in the film Two Horses of Genghis Khan.

Reception
Andrea Murray's description in The Herald-Times of one of her performances gives an intriguing insight into the extraordinary characteristics of her singing:

References

External links
Urna Chahar Tugchi official website

20th-century Mongolian women singers
21st-century Mongolian women singers
Shanghai Conservatory of Music alumni
1969 births
Living people